The 1926–27 Duke Blue Devils men's basketball team represented Duke University during the 1926–27 men's college basketball season. The head coach was George Buchheit, coaching his third season with the Blue Devils. The team finished with an overall record of 4–10.

Schedule

|-

References

Duke Blue Devils men's basketball seasons
Duke
1926 in sports in North Carolina
1927 in sports in North Carolina